The Big Sur International Marathon is an annual marathon held in California, United States along the Pacific coast. The marathon was established in 1986 and attracts about 4,500 participants annually.

In addition to the marathon, the event usually includes a  race, a relay, a 5K run, and various walks. Runners in the marathon have 6 hours in which to complete it. Since the marathon was first run, over $2 million in grants has been disbursed to charities.

The finish line for all events is the Crossroads Shopping Center in Carmel, California. The Marathon begins south of Pfeiffer Big Sur State Park, the Power Walk and  race begin at Andrew Molera State Park, and the  walk and run begin at Rocky Point Restaurant. The  and 5 km races begin and end at the finish line. The Marathon route follows State Route 1 and crosses the Bixby Creek Bridge at the halfway point. Hurricane Point is the summit of 560 feet between mile markers 10 and 12. There are 11 aid stations along the route. The marathon course is known for its challenging hills in the second half of the race.

The 2020 and 2021 editions of the race were cancelled due to the coronavirus pandemic, with all registrants of the 2020 edition receiving a 60% refund and given the option to sign up during a priority registration period for 2022 or 2023.

Winners 

The Ultimate Guide to Marathons described  the Big Sur Marathon as the best marathon in the world.

Notes

References

External links
Big Sur International Marathon
Big Sur International Marathon Elevation Profile
Article about Jonathon Lee's last marathon concert in Monterey County Weekly

Marathons in California
Marathons in the United States
Foot races in California
Recurring sporting events established in 1986
Tourist attractions in Monterey County, California
Sports in Monterey County, California
Big Sur
Wheelchair marathons